Boutan Rocks are a small group of rocks lying  southwest of Bruce Island, off the west coast of Graham Land. The rocks appear on an Argentine government chart of 1954. They were named by the UK Antarctic Place-Names Committee in 1960 for Louis Marie-Auguste Boutan (1859–1934), French naturalist and pioneer of submarine photography, 1893–98.

References
 

Rock formations of Graham Land
Danco Coast